Til Your River Runs Dry is a 2013 album by Eric Burdon. It is his "first high-profile record in eons and his first album of largely original material since 2004", states Stephen Thomas Erlewine in his Allmusic review.

The album peaked number 168 on the Billboard 200, #15 on the Billboard Tastemakers and #57 on the German album chart.

Track listing
 "Water" (Eric Burdon, Dave Steen) – 4:20
 "Memorial Day" ( Tony Braunagel, Eric Burdon, Terry Wilson) – 4:39
 "Devil And Jesus" ( Eric Burdon, Gregg Sutton) – 4:22
 "Wait" ( Eric Burdon, Terry Wilson) – 3:45
 "Old Habits Die Hard" (Eric Burdon, Tom Hambridge) – 4:00
 "Bo Diddley Special" ( Eric Burdon, Terry Wilson) – 5:29
 "In The Ground" ( Eric Burdon, Terry Wilson, Stuart Ziff) – 4:10
 "27 Forever" ( Eric Burdon, Terry Wilson) – 4:27
 "River Is Rising" ( Tony Braunagel, Eric Burdon, Jon Cleary) – 5:59
 "Medicine Man" (Marc Cohn) – 4:39
 "Invitation to the White House" (Eric Burdon) – 5:55
 "Before You Accuse Me" (Bo Diddley) – 3:13

Personnel
Musicians
 Eric Burdon – vocals
 Johnny Lee Schell – guitar
 Billy Watts – guitar
 Eric McFadden – guitar, mandolin, Spanish guitar
 Terry Wilson – bass
 Reggie McBride – bass
 Tony Braunagel – drums, percussion, background vocals
 Brannen Tempel – drums
 Wally Ingram – percussion, congas
 Lenny Castro – percussion
 Mike Finnigan – Hammond B3, piano
 Red Young – keyboards, Hammond B3
 Jim Pugh – keyboards, piano
 Jon Cleary – piano, guitar
 Darrell Leonard – trumpet
 Joe Sublett – sax
 Matt Perrine – tuba
 Crag Klein – trombone
 Shaamar Allen – trumpet
 Will Wheaton – background vocals
 Billy Valentine – background vocals
 Teresa James – background vocals
 Leslie Smith – vocal arrangement

Production
 Marianna Burdon – executive producer, photos
 Doug Sax with Eric Boulanger – mastering at The Mastering Lab www.themasteringlab.com
 Ed Cherney – mixing
 Christianna Proestou – cover design and layout
 Brian Fitzpatrick – art director
 Teri Landi – music production coordinator
 Michael Allen – marketing
 Danielle Boone – coordinator

References

External links
 

2013 albums
Eric Burdon albums